Heeren is a village and a former municipality in the district of Stendal, in Saxony-Anhalt, Germany. Since 1 January 2010, it is part of the town Stendal, of which it is an Ortschaft (municipal division).

Notable residents
Albert Ferdinand Adolf Karl Friedrich von Bonin (1803–1872), Prussian general

References

Former municipalities in Saxony-Anhalt
Stendal